Morro Vento (also: Morro de Vento) is a settlement in the island of Santo Antão, Cape Verde. It is situated in the mountainous interior of the island, 9 km north of the island capital Porto Novo.  The settlement is named after the hill Morro do Vento, elevation 1,409 meters.

References

Villages and settlements in Santo Antão, Cape Verde
Porto Novo Municipality